The Massive was an ongoing, monthly comic book series created by Brian Wood and published by Dark Horse Comics. Dave Stewart's work as a colorist in the first nine issues of the series earned him the Eisner Award for Best Coloring in 2013.

Publication history
The Massive was originally launched in the pages of Dark Horse's comics anthology, Dark Horse Presents in the form of three eight-page short stories in issues 8–10. These stories were later collected as a digital one-shot, published 22 April 2012. The official launch of the monthly ongoing series came later, beginning in June 2012. In 2015, Dark Horse published a six issue prequel titled The Massive: Ninth Wave, telling the story of the environmental group before the world's eco-crash.  The prequel series was later collected in a hardcover library edition published in 2016.

Issues

References

2012 comics debuts
Post-apocalyptic comics